Paglat, officially the Municipality of Paglat (Maguindanaon: Ingud nu Paglat; Iranun: Inged a Paglat), is a  municipality in the province of Maguindanao del Sur, Philippines. According to the 2020 census, it has a population of 18,727 people.

History
It was created under Muslim Mindanao Autonomy Act No. 112 on July 19, 2001, carved out of the municipality of General S.K. Pendatun.

The first appointed mayor was Bai Zulaika Pendatun-Langkuno, however, her appointment was recalled by then ARMM Governor Nur Misuari to give way for her cousin Datu Conte Mangelen, son of the then Congressman Datu Luminog Mangelen of Cotabato Province.

Geography

Barangays
Paglat is politically subdivided into 8 barangays.

Campo 
Damakling
Damalusay
Kakal 
Poblacion/Paglat
Salam
Tual
Upper Idtig

Climate

Demographics

Economy

References

External links
 Paglat Profile at the DTI Cities and Municipalities Competitive Index
MMA Act No. 112: An Act Creating Municipality of Paglas in the Province of Maguindanao
 [ Philippine Standard Geographic Code]
Philippine Census Information
Local Governance Performance Management System

Municipalities of Maguindanao del Sur